Schalk Burger may refer to:

Schalk Willem Burger (1852–1918), acting President of the South African Republic from 1900 to 1902
Schalk Burger (born 1983), South African rugby union flanker
Schalk Burger (rugby union, born 1955), South African rugby union player
Schalk Burger Geldenhuys, South African rugby union player